Ryburn Valley High School is a secondary school and sixth form located in the town of Sowerby Bridge, West Yorkshire, England. Originally built in the 1950s, it moved into a new building in 2005.

History 
Ryburn Valley High School opened in February 1959 as Ryburn County Secondary Modern School. It was a new mixed secondary school representing the merger of Sowerby Bridge Girls' School and Sowerby Bridge Boys' School. The advent of the comprehensive system gave birth to the name Ryburn Valley High School in 1979. It has grown from 600 pupils in 1959 to almost 1500 in 2013.

The new building was confirmed in 2001 and was built from 2004 to 2005. The pupils moved into the building after spring half term in 2005.

Ryburn Valley High School was awarded specialist status in Media Arts in 2004.
In 2016, the first Ryburrn Academy Awards were held at the Victoria Theatre in Halifax

The school received a rating of Grade 2, 'Good', for overall effectiveness in its 2013 Ofsted inspection report.

The school converted to academy status in September 2014.

Television appearances 
During the spring of 2016, a local camera crew from the BBC used the school as a set piece for the crime/drama television series Happy Valley.

In 2019, Ryburn Valley High School appeared in the CBBC show, Our School. This showed the journey of new Year 7 and 8's joining Ryburn Valley High School.

Headteachers 
 1959–1969Robert Miles
 1969–1976John Widdows
 1976–1978, 1986Morton Roberts
 1978–1986William Nicholson
 1986–1998Tony Thorne
 1998Bridget Rickwood (Acting)
 1999–2008Ian Adam
 2008–2013Honor Byford
 2013–presentDavid Lord

Notable former pupils
 Craig Fleming, former football player, and former captain of Norwich City Football Club

References

Secondary schools in Calderdale
Academies in Calderdale
Sowerby Bridge